Haftkhaneh or Haft Khaneh may refer to:
 Haft Khaneh, Kermanshah
 Haftkhaneh, Razavi Khorasan